Peter Atwill Griffith (October 23, 1933 – May 14, 2001) was an American advertising executive and child stage actor, appearing on Broadway a few times. His daughters Melanie Griffith and Tracy Griffith and his granddaughter Dakota Johnson became actresses.

Life and career
Griffith was born in Baltimore, Maryland, the son of Hilda (née Atwill) and Ben E. Griffith. He had one sister, Sally Ann Griffith. His mother managed his stage acting career as he worked as a child actor, appearing on Broadway a few times.

Griffith married five times. In 1952, at age 18, he married 22-year-old Tippi Hedren, who later worked as an actress. They had a daughter, Melanie Griffith, before divorcing in 1959. In 1960, he married actress Nanita Greene, and together they had two children, Tracy Griffith who also became an actress, and Clay Griffith, a set decorator and production designer. In the early 1970s he moved his family to Saint John, U.S. Virgin Islands, and in 1976 separated from Greene. After a fourth divorce from Marianne Vernon, an owner of a Charlotte Amalia designer clothing store, Griffith married Debra Meyer Boyd and remained with her until his death. In 1992, he sold his real-estate business, Holiday Homes, and moved to New Mexico.

Death
Griffith died aged 67 on May 14, 2001, in Santa Fe, New Mexico from complications from emphysema.

References

1933 births
2001 deaths
Male actors from Baltimore
American male film actors
American military personnel of the Korean War
Deaths from emphysema
Businesspeople from Baltimore
Actors from Santa Fe, New Mexico
20th-century American male actors
Peter
20th-century American businesspeople